A mixedwood stand is a forest type in which 26% to 75% of the canopy is made up of softwood trees.

Uncertainties of the definition, extent, and potential of mixedwood types necessitate the placement of some mensurational bounds on the subject of mixedwood management, especially the distribution and component sub-types, age classes, advance growth, productivity, and rotation ages. A major ecological factor in mixedwood management is the spruce budworm; another is the problem of providing for sufficient white spruce regeneration.

The white spruce–aspen mixedwood associations of the Prairie Provinces have a variety of compositions ranging from pure aspen to pure white spruce, to mixtures of both. Balsam poplar, white birch, black spruce, balsam fir, and pines may also occur. Silvicultural treatments have generally been aimed at promoting white spruce, primarily through plantation establishment and management. The type of stand of a given association is as much a product of successional stage and stand history  as it is of site type.  Depending on seed source and seedbed conditions, recruitment of white spruce may begin relatively soon after disturbance or may be spread over many decades.

Management of mixedwoods in the Prairie Provinces in the 1990s usually used clearcutting. When aspen is the main species to be regenerated, little treatment is applied to the site, but slash piles, compaction of soil, and damage to aspen root systems are minimized as much as is feasible in order to encourage suckering. In the coniferous harvest, aspen that is not harvested is usually left standing to reduce suckering, as well as for the benefit of wildlife. Regeneration of white spruce is more difficult. In general, plantation techniques are used, with mechanical site preparation following clearcutting. Depending on site conditions and availability of equipment, disk trenching, double disking, blading, ripper, or Marttiini plowing, Bracke spot scarification, high-speed mixing, or spot mounding are used. Plantings of white spruce have come to favour the use of large container or transplant stock. In the early years after clearcutting, site preparation and planting, shade-intolerant vegetation, such as aspen, Calamagrostis canadensis, and green alder compete strongly with the young outplants, frequently causing death.

References

Taiga and boreal forests